The Welsh Indoor Bowls Association (WIBA) is the governing body for the indoor bowling clubs in Wales. It has 24 affiliated clubs. The WBA organise competitions, including the WIBA Club Championship, and select and manage the national side.

The Welsh Bowling Association is based at Gorseinon, Swansea.

See also
Welsh Bowls Federation
Welsh Bowling Association
Welsh Crown Green Bowling Association
Welsh Ladies Indoor Bowling Association
Welsh Short Mat Bowls Association
Welsh Women’s Bowling Association

References

External links
Official website

Sports governing bodies in Wales
Bowls in Wales
Organisations based in Swansea